Halden Håndballklubb was a women's handball team based in Halden. The team played in Eliteserien, the top division in the country, after its promotion in 2014. On 28 February 2017, the club announced they were bankrupt.

Honours
Norwegian Cup:
Finalist: 2014

Notable former club players
  Martine Moen
  Pernille Wang Skaug
  Thea Øby-Olsen
  Rikke Granlund
  Anette Helene Hansen
  Malene Staal
  Hanne Frandsen
  Cecilie Mørch Hansen
  Julie Gantzel Pedersen
  Melanie Felber
  Sofie Fynbo Larsen
  Charlotte Bisser

EHF Cup Winners' Cup (defunct)

References

External links
 

Norwegian handball clubs
Sport in Halden